Tiddim/Tedim also known as Paite are Zomi which are an ethnic group of Myanmar, India and Bangladesh. They generally inhabited Chin State, Southern Manipur and Chittagong hills Bangladesh.  They speak the Zomi language (locally known as Zomi pau) which had a total of about 545,000 speakers in 1990. About 380,000 of Zomi lived in Burma with some 230,000 of them residing in India, Bangladesh and further other countries.The Zomi are numbered at about 617,000 people.  About 70 percent of the Zomi are Christians, with the remainder practicing indigenous religions.

The Bible was translated into Zomi in 1983, although the New Testament had been translated into and published in Zomi in 1932.

The Zomi reside primarily in Chin State in Burma and in adjacent parts of India, such as Manipur.

References

External links
Article on Tiddim Chin language
Joshua project entry on the Tiddim
Ethnologue entry for Tiddim
World scriptures article on Tiddim

Ethnic groups in Myanmar
Christianity in Myanmar
Ethnic groups in India